The European Journal of Organic Chemistry is a weekly peer-reviewed scientific journal covering organic chemistry. It is published by Wiley-VCH on behalf of Chemistry Europe.

The journal, along with the European Journal of Inorganic Chemistry, was established in 1998 as the result of a merger of Chemische Berichte/Recueil, Bulletin de la Société Chimique de France, Bulletin des Sociétés Chimiques Belges, Gazzetta Chimica Italiana, Recueil des Travaux Chimiques des Pays-Bas, Anales de Química, Chimika Chronika, Revista Portuguesa de Química, and ACH-Models in Chemistry.

According to the Journal Citation Reports, the journal has a 2021 impact factor of 3.261.

See also
List of chemistry journals
European Journal of Inorganic Chemistry

References

External links

Chemistry Europe academic journals
Wiley (publisher) academic journals
Organic chemistry journals
Publications established in 1997
English-language journals
Wiley-VCH academic journals